Karl Borromäus Rottmanner (30 October 1783 – 8 July 1824) was a German poet, philosopher, and politician. Born in Munich, he was the son of lawyer and agricultural reformer Simon Rottmanner (1740-1813) and his wife Maria Anna Barbara Paur (1746–1828). His first cousin once removed was German composer and organist Eduard Rottmanner. He studied law at the Ludwig Maximilian University of Munich where he earned a PhD. While a student there he belonged to a student patriotic movement led by Johann Nepomuk von Ringseis. After graduating, he became a member of the Landtag of Bavaria. He died in Ast.

Works
Kritik der Abhandlung Jacobis, 1808
Frühlingsblumen, 1808
Sammlung bayrischer Volkslieder, 1810
Ferner Artikel für die "Zeitschrift für Wissenschaft und Kunst"

References
Klaus Unterburger: "Rottmanner, Karl", Neue Deutsche Biographie.

1783 births
1824 deaths
German philosophers
19th-century German poets
Members of the Bavarian Chamber of Deputies
Ludwig Maximilian University of Munich alumni
German male poets
19th-century German male writers